Stephen Aloysius Leven (April 30, 1905 – June 28, 1983) was an American prelate of the Roman Catholic Church. He served as Bishop of San Angelo from 1969 to 1979.

Biography

Early life and education
Stephen Leven was born in Blackwell, Oklahoma, to Joseph J. and Gertrude (née Conrady) Leven. One of nine children, he was raised on farms around Ponca City and Newkirk, where his father was a sharecropper. He received his early education at St. Mary's School in Ponca City and St. Francis Academy in Newkirk. He then attended St. Gregory's College in Shawnee, and later St. Benedict's College in Atchison, Kansas. He studied for the priesthood at St. Mary's Seminary in Houston, Texas, for a year before entering the American College of the Immaculate Conception in Leuven, Belgium in 1922.

Ordination and ministry
Leven was ordained a priest for the Diocese of Oklahoma on June 10, 1928. At age 23, he was below the age requirement for ordination but was granted a dispensation by Pope Pius XI. His first assignment was as a curate at the Cathedral of Our Lady of Perpetual Help in Oklahoma City, where he remained for four years. During that period, he also served as secretary to Bishop Francis Kelley for two years. He served as a pastor in Bristow and Drumright from 1932 to 1935. In 1933, he began a street preaching ministry based on the work of the Catholic Evidence Guild.  On one occasion, the KKK burned a cross as a personal threat at a corner where Leven was accustomed to preach.

From 1935 to 1938, Leven served as vice-rector of the American College at Louvain. Following his return to Oklahoma, he was appointed a pastor in Tonkawa and his native Blackwell in 1938. From 1939 to 1940, he served as director of the National Center of Confraternity of Christian Doctrine. During World War II, he was the official representative of the Holy See to nine German POW camps in Oklahoma.

Auxiliary Bishop of San Antonio
On December 3, 1955, Leven was appointed auxiliary bishop of the Archdiocese of San Antonio and titular bishop of Bure by Pope Pius XII. He was consecrated on February 8, 1956 by Bishop Eugene J. McGuinness, with Bishops Thomas Kiely Gorman and James A. McNulty serving as co-consecrators, at the Cathedral of Our Lady of Perpetual Help. As an auxiliary bishop, he assisted Archbishop Robert E. Lucey in performing confirmations and ordinations. Between 1962 and 1965, he attended all four sessions of the Second Vatican Council in Rome. At the Council, he defended non-Catholics by saying, "It just is not bearable to hear them talked about as some kind of strange entity or freak." He also spoke in favor of the increased participation of the laity.

Bishop of San Angelo
Leven was appointed the third Bishop of San Angelo on October 20, 1969. His installation took place at Sacred Heart Cathedral on November 25 of that year. Credited with making the Diocese of San Angelo financially solvent, he resolved several long-standing financial problems that were burdening the diocese. He also initiated the permanent diaconate program, which trained and ordained more than sixty men to serve as deacons in parishes and missions across the diocese.

Leven resigned as Bishop of San Angelo due to poor health on April 24, 1979. He retired to his native Blackwell, Oklahoma, and died there at age 78.

References

1905 births
1983 deaths
People from Blackwell, Oklahoma
St. Gregory's University alumni
Roman Catholic Archdiocese of Oklahoma City
20th-century Roman Catholic bishops in the United States
Roman Catholic Ecclesiastical Province of San Antonio
Catholic University of Leuven (1834–1968) alumni
American College of the Immaculate Conception alumni
Participants in the Second Vatican Council
Religious leaders from Texas
Religious leaders from Oklahoma
Catholics from Oklahoma